Shahar Pe'er is the defending champion, but chose not to participate this year.

Barbora Štefková, won the title, defeating Anastasia Pivovarova in the final, 7–5, 2–6, 6–1.

Seeds

Draw

Finals

Top half

Bottom half

References 
 Main draw

Lale Cup - Singles
Lale Cup